Henry Herbert may refer to:

British peers 
 Henry Herbert (MP for Monmouthshire) (died 1598), MP for Monmouthshire
 Henry Herbert, 2nd Earl of Pembroke (1534–1601), Custos Rotulorum and Lord Lieutenant
 Henry Herbert, 9th Earl of Pembroke (1693–1749), English colonel, Groom of the Stole, Lord Lieutenant of Wiltshire 1733–1750
 Henry Herbert, 10th Earl of Pembroke (1734–1794), Lord of the Bedchamber, Governor of Portsmouth and Lord Lieutenant of Wiltshire 1756–1780 and 1782–1794
 Henry Herbert, 17th Earl of Pembroke (1939–2003), British aristocrat, film director and producer
 Henry Herbert, 1st Baron Herbert of Chirbury (1654–1709), English MP for Bewdley and for Worcester, Custos Rotulorum of Brecknockshire
 Henry Herbert, 2nd Baron Herbert of Chirbury (a. 1678–1738)
 Henry Herbert, 4th Baron Herbert of Chirbury (c. 1640–1691), English aristocrat, soldier and politician
 Henry Herbert, 1st Earl of Carnarvon (1741–1811), English MP for Wilton, Master of the Horse
 Henry Herbert, 2nd Earl of Carnarvon (1772–1833), his son, English MP for Cricklade
 Henry Herbert, 3rd Earl of Carnarvon (1800–1849), English MP for Wootton Bassett
 Henry Herbert, 4th Earl of Carnarvon (1831–1890), Secretary of State for the Colonies and Lord Lieutenant of Ireland
 Henry Herbert, 6th Earl of Carnarvon (1898–1987), British peer
 Henry Herbert, 7th Earl of Carnarvon (1924–2001), English peer and racing manager
 Henry Arthur Herbert, 1st Earl of Powis (1703–1772)

Other people 
 Henry Herbert (Master of the Revels) (1595–1673), to Charles I and Charles II of England
 Henry Herbert aka Master Herbert, English child actor
 Henry Herbert (actor) (died 1947), English stage actor and producer, better known in the U.S.
 Henry Arthur Herbert (1756–1821), Anglo-Irish landowner and Irish MP for Kerry and Tralee, British MP for East Grinstead
 Henry Arthur Herbert (1815–1866), grandson of the above, Anglo-Irish landowner and Chief Secretary for Ireland, British MP for Kerry 1847–1866
 Henry Arthur Herbert (1840–1901), son of the above, Anglo-Irish landowner and British MP for Kerry 1866–1880
 Henry William Herbert (1807–1858), novelist and sports writer
 Henry Herbert (cricketer) (1863–1884), English cricketer
 Henry Herbert (Parliamentarian) (1617–?), Welsh politician who sat in the House of Commons of England
 Henry Lloyd Herbert, chairman of the United States Polo Association in 1890

See also 
 Harry Herbert (1934–2011), former Australian rules footballer